Gary Neville Nelson (born 15 May 1952) is an Australian Anglican bishop who served as Bishop of North West Australia (the largest diocese in geographical size in the Anglican Church of Australia, covering approximately a quarter of the Australian continent) from 26 May 2012 to 15 May 2022.

Early life
He grew up in Western Sydney and trained as a teacher at Sydney University. He spent two years with his wife in Papua New Guinea as missionary teachers.

Ministry
He was assistant curate in Dapto and later rector of Panania. 

Nelson served as Director of External Studies at Moore Theological College from 2006 until his appointment as Bishop of North West Australia in 2012.

Nelson stated that in the event that same-sex marriage was legalised in Australia, if he believes that religious freedom is not adequately protected,  he will refuse to register any marriages.

Nelson retired from the role of bishop on 15 May 2022, on reaching the retirement age of 70 years.

References

1952 births
21st-century Anglican bishops in Australia
Moore Theological College alumni
Clergy from Sydney
University of Sydney alumni
Anglican bishops of North West Australia
Living people
Evangelical Anglican bishops